The 1902 Ontario general election was the tenth general election held in the Province of Ontario, Canada.  It was held on May 29, 1902, to elect the 98 Members of the 10th Legislative Assembly of Ontario ("MLAs").

The Ontario Liberal Party, led by Sir George William Ross, formed the government for a ninth consecutive term, although with only a very slim, two-seat majority in the Legislature.

The Ontario Conservative Party, led by Sir James P. Whitney formed the official opposition.

Expansion of the Legislative Assembly
The number of electoral districts was increased from 93 to 97, under an Act passed in 1902. Ottawa in both cases was entitled to elect two members, and thus 98 MLAs would now be elected to the Legislature. The following electoral changes were made:

 Algoma West was divided into Fort William and Lake of the Woods and Port Arthur and Rainy River
 Algoma East was divided into Algoma, Manitoulin and Sault Ste. Marie
 Nipissing was divided into Nipissing East and Nipissing West

Results

|-
! colspan=2 rowspan=2 | Political party
! rowspan=2 | Party leader
! colspan=5 | MPPs
! colspan=3 | Votes
|-
! Candidates
!1898
!Dissol.
!1902
!±
!#
!%
! ± (pp)

|style="text-align:left;"|George William Ross
|94
|51
|
|50
|1
|206,709
|47.54%
|0.25

|style="text-align:left;"|James P. Whitney
|97
|42
|
|48
|6
|215,883
|49.65%
|1.96

|style="text-align:left;"|
|2
|1
|
|–
|1
|1,646
|0.38%
|0.03

|style="text-align:left;"|
|4
|–
|–
|–
|
|5,133
|1.18%
|3.42

|style="text-align:left;"|
|6
|–
|–
|–
|
|3,126
|0.72%
|

|style="text-align:left;"|
|9
|–
|–
|–
|
|1,993
|0.46%
|

|style="text-align:left;"|
|4
|–
|–
|–
|
|277
|0.06%
|

|style="text-align:left;"|
|1
|–
|–
|–
|
|colspan="3"|Did not campaign

|colspan="3"|
|
|colspan="5"|
|-style="background:#E9E9E9;"
|colspan="3" style="text-align:left;"|Total
|216
|94
|94
|98
|
|434,767
|100.00%
|
|-
|colspan="8" style="text-align:left;"|Blank and invalid ballots
|align="right"|4,021
|style="background:#E9E9E9;" colspan="2"|
|-style="background:#E9E9E9;"
|colspan="8" style="text-align:left;"|Registered voters / turnout
|588,570
|74.55%
|7.50
|}

Division of ridings

The newly created ridings returned the following MLAs:

Seats that changed hands

Of the constituencies that were not altered, there were 23 seats that changed allegiance in the election:

Liberal to Conservative
Bruce Centre
Essex North
Lambton West
Lennox
London
Norfolk North
Northumberland East
Ottawa (2nd MLA)
Oxford South
Perth North
Wellington South
York West

 Conservative to Liberal
Durham West
Grey North
Middlesex East
Ontario South
Prince Edward
Renfrew North
Simcoe Centre
Simcoe East
Stormont
Wentworth North

 Independent-Conservative to Conservative
Carleton

Notable candidates

Margaret Haile, a Canadian Socialist League candidate in Toronto North, made history as the first woman ever to run for political office in Canada.

See also

Politics of Ontario
List of Ontario political parties
Premier of Ontario
Leader of the Opposition (Ontario)

References

Further reading
 

1902 elections in Canada
1902
1902 in Ontario
May 1902 events